This is a list of Torino F.C. players who have been inducted into the Hall of Fame Granata.

History

The Hall of Fame Granata (granata is the English for "maroon", the club's traditional colour) was created by the Museo del Grande Torino e della Leggenda Granata, which is run by the Associazione Memoria Storica Granata, an association of volunteer supporters who helped save the trophies and relics of the club during the demolition of the ancient Stadio Filadelfia, where they were kept. The Hall of Fame Granata was established in 2014 to celebrate those who have contributed in various ways to the history of the club. The award is divided into five categories: goalkeepers, defenders, midfielders, forwards, and special award (this category encompasses managers, presidents, directors, owners and people who contributed to raise and spread the spirit of the club in many ways).

List of Hall of Fame inductees

Players

Special award

References

External links
 Torino F.C. Hall of Fame at MuseodelToro.it

Hall of Fame
Halls of fame in Italy